Jennifer Johnston (born 12 January 1930) is an Irish novelist. She has won a number of awards, including the Whitbread Book Award for The Old Jest in 1979 and a Lifetime Achievement from the Irish Book Awards (2012). The Old Jest, a novel about the Irish War of Independence, was later made into a film called The Dawning, starring Anthony Hopkins, produced by Sarah Lawson and directed by Robert Knights.

Biography
She was born in Dublin to Irish actress and director Shelah Richards and Irish playwright Denis Johnston. A cousin of actress and film star Geraldine Fitzgerald, via Fitzgerald's mother, Edith (née Richards), Jennifer Johnston was educated at Trinity College, Dublin. For decades, she lived in Derry, and currently lives near Dublin. Other cousins include the actresses Tara Fitzgerald and Susan Fitzgerald.

Johnston was born into the Church of Ireland and many of her novels deal with the fading of the Protestant Anglo-Irish ascendancy in the 20th century. She married a fellow student at Trinity College, Ian Smyth, in 1951. Johnston is a member of Aosdána.

Awards and honours
2012 Irish Book Awards Lifetime Achievement Award
2006 Irish PEN Award
1989 Giles Cooper Awards for O Ananias, Azarias and Misael
1979 Whitbread Book Award for The Old Jest in 1979
1977 Booker Prize shortlist for Shadows on our Skin
1973 Authors' Club First Novel Award for The Captains and the Kings

List of works
Novels
 The Captains and the Kings (1972), winner of the Author's Club First Novel Award
 The Gates (1973)
 How Many Miles to Babylon? (1974)
 Shadows on Our Skin (1977), shortlisted for the Booker Prize
 The Old Jest (1979), winner of a Whitbread Book Award for 1979
 The Nightingale and Not the Lark (1980)
 The Christmas Tree (1981)
 The Railway Station Man (1984)
 Fool's Sanctuary (1987)
 The Invisible Worm (1991)
 The Illusionist (1995)
 Three Monologues: "Twinkletoes", "Musn't Forget High Noon", "Christine" (1995)
 The Desert Lullaby (1996)
 Finbar's Hotel, edited by Dermot Bolger (1997) (Contributor)
 Two Moons (1998)
 The Essential Jennifer Johnston (1999) (contains The Captains and the Kings, The Railway Station Man, and Fool's Sanctuary)
 Great Irish Stories of Murder and Mystery (2000) (Contributor)
 The Gingerbread Woman (2000)
 Mondschatten (2000)
 This is not a Novel (2002)
 Grace and Truth (2005)
 Foolish Mortals (2007)
 Truth or Fiction (2009)
 Shadowstory (2011)
 Fathers and Son (2012)
 A Sixpenny Song (2013)
 Naming the Stars (2015)

Plays
 The Nightingale and Not the Lark (1981)
 Indian Summer (1983)
 Andante un Poco Mosso, in The Best Short Plays 1983 (1983)
 The Porch (1986)
 The Desert Lullaby: A Play in Two Acts (1996)
 The Christmas Tree: A Play in Two Acts (2015)

See also
 List of winners and shortlisted authors of the Booker Prize for Fiction

References

External links
 
 "Jennifer Johnston's Works", provides a decidedly pejorative view of Johnston's works
 
 Jennifer Johnston (1930- ) 
 Jennifer Johnston on Amazon.com

1930 births
Living people
Aosdána members
Fellows of the Royal Society of Literature
Irish women novelists
Writers from Dublin (city)
Irish women dramatists and playwrights
20th-century Irish novelists
20th-century Irish women writers
21st-century Irish novelists
21st-century Irish women writers
20th-century Irish dramatists and playwrights
21st-century Irish dramatists and playwrights
People educated at Rathdown School
Irish PEN Award for Literature winners